Ipomoea costata, commonly known as rock morning glory, is an Australian native plant.  It is found in northern Australia, from Western Australia, through the Northern Territory, to Queensland. Its tubers  provide a form of bush tucker to some Aboriginal peoples, known as bush potato, or (to the Ngururrpa groups in WA), karnti.

Description
It is a prostrate or climbing perennial growing up to 3 m high, with purple-blue-pink flowers from February to November.  Juvenile form is a vine, maturing into a woody-stemmed shrub with vine-like stems. Leaves are broad and leathery, 4-9 cm long. Tubers are rounded, 12-20 cm long by 5-18 cm wide, with a single plant potentially having up to twenty tubers.

Habitat
It occurs on sandy or rocky soils, often over limestone, and on spinifex sand plains in northern Australia.

Uses
It is the source of bush potato, a bush tucker food for  Aboriginal people. Bush potatoes are cooked on the warm earth under coals, and are peeled when cooked.

Aboriginal names
In Central Australia, I. costata is also known to Aboriginal people by the following names:

Alyawarr: anaty
Anmatyerr: anaty or anek
Eastern Arrernte: anatye
Western Arrernte: natye
Pintupi: ala or yala
Warlpiri: karnti or paparda

References

External links
Alice Springs Town Council

Solanales of Australia
Bushfood
Australian Aboriginal bushcraft
costata
Eudicots of Western Australia
Flora of the Northern Territory
Flora of Queensland